Acrobasis flavifasciella is a species of snout moth in the genus Acrobasis. It was described by Hiroshi Yamanaka in 1990. It is found in Japan.

References

Moths described in 1990
Acrobasis
Moths of Japan